The 1920 Arkansas Razorbacks football team represented the University of Arkansas in the Southwest Conference (SWC) during the 1920 college football season. In their first year under head coach George McLaren, the Razorbacks compiled a 3–2–2 record (2–0–1 against SWC opponents), finished in third place in the SWC, shut out five of their nine opponents, and outscored all opponents by a combined total of 42 to 22.

Schedule

References

Arkansas
Arkansas Razorbacks football seasons
Arkansas Razorbacks football